Winner (romanized: wineo; stylized in all caps) is a South Korean boy band consisting of four members: Jinu, Hoony, Mino and Seungyoon. The band was formed in 2013 by YG Entertainment through Mnet's survival program WIN: Who Is Next leading to their official debut on August 17, 2014, with studio album 2014 S/S. Originally a five-piece band, Taehyun, departed from the group in November 2016 for his mental health and well-being. Upon their debut, The Korea Herald cited their immediate success as "unprecedented" for a new group, thus dubbed as "Monster rookies". Winner is often cited as a "self-producing" band with all members actively taking on roles from producing and choreographing to designing and marketing. The band also earned the titles "Trust and Listen" alongside "Kings of Summer" by media outlets and the general public through releases.

As of March 2019, Winner was recorded as the fastest Korean act to top the Billboard World Album Chart with their debut album 2014 S/S, and topped domestic charts on Gaon for both their album and lead single "Empty". Winner is currently the fastest act to win on a televised music show, with a time of five days. As of October 2019, they are the only artists to have all lead singles consecutively top Melon five years straight since debut. Their success in Asia earned them numerous awards for music, fashion and popularity including the Melon Music Awards, MTV Asia Music Gala and Style Icon Awards. Following the band's reformation, Winner's lead single, "Really Really" from their first single album Fate Number For (2017), instantly went to number one in South Korea. It went on to sell over 2.5 million digital copies domestically and surpass 100 million streams on Gaon, making Winner the first-ever K-pop boy group in history to achieve this while keeping their "Chart-In" status.

Throughout their career, the band cumulatively held over 100 concerts. Their first world tour, Winner Everywhere Tour in 2018, was the band's largest tour to date. Winner is also known through endorsement deals with brands Adidas, Oreo, Kiehl's and more. The band actively participates in various charitable activities and animal campaigns.

History

2010–2013: Formation and pre-debut activities

In 2010, the group's leader Kang Seung-yoon was a contestant on Mnet's Superstar K2, finishing in fourth place.  The following year, he signed with YGE and made his acting debut in the MBC sitcom High Kick: Revenge of the Short Legged. In 2013, he debuted as a solo artist and released multiple songs, including hit single "It Rains". In 2010, Kim Jin-woo was brought to the agency by Big Bang's Seungri through  Joy Dance Plug In Music Academy. Nam Tae-hyun was recruited through audition in 2011. Lee Seung-hoon competed in SBS's K-pop Star in 2012, finishing in fourth place. Soon after, he signed under YGE the same year on May 22. Song Min-ho initially debuted under Y2Y Contents Company in the group BoM, which disbanded two years later. In 2013, he joined YGE through audition, after being noticed from his appearance in Channel A's The Strongest K-POP Survival.

On August 23, 2013, the five competed as "Team A" on Mnet survival program Win: Who Is Next against "Team B", consisting of trainees they also have trained with under the label. Throughout the span of 100 days, the show consisted of three rounds of performances and public voting. During the finale, on October 25 Team A was announced as the winners thus claiming the title "Winner" and commencing with preparation for debut. They performed as the opening act at labelmate senior Big Bang's Japanese dome tour beginning on November 15. From December 13, Winner broadcast their reality program, Winner TV, consisting of ten episodes on Mnet showcasing their debut preparation and lifestyle.

2014–2016: Debut with 2014 S/S, immediate success, international recognition and Taehyun's departure

On March 1–2, 2014, Winner performed as guests at label-mate senior 2NE1's All or Nothing World Tour in Seoul.  The quintet continued their appearance as guest performers in other stops including Hong Kong on March 22, April 11 in China, April 26–27 in Taiwan, May 17 in Philippines, and May 24 in Malaysia. Amidst touring with 2NE1, Winner joined the YG Family Power World Tour from April 12. Between June and August, the group members were re-introduced to the public after eight months in anticipation for their debut, through series of teaser images and videos. Ahead of their debut, on August 6 Winner held a showcase in the form of a launch party with an audience of 400 attendees. The event held a fashion show with models from YG KPlus on the runway and ultimately finishing with the members themselves in unique suits. Media outlets quoted the event as "uncommon" and "fresh". It gave an insight to the classy image the group presented with their debut and the digital release of the studio album 2014 S/S on August 12 and its physical release on August 14.

After several delays, the group officially debuted on August 17 with lead singles "Empty" and "Color Ring", also marking their first music show appearance on SBS' Inkigayo. The quintet became the fastest group to win on a music show through M! Countdown, doing so in five days. 2014 S/S charted at number one on the Gaon Album Chart as well as the Billboard World Albums Chart, while lead singles "Empty" and "Color Ring" claimed first and third respectively on the Gaon Digital Chart. The Korea Herald cited the success of their lead single "Empty" as "unprecedented" for a newly debuted group, thus claiming the title "Monster rookies". Their commercial success earned them the 'Top 10 Artist' award on Melon Music Awards, followed by multiple 'Best New Artist' awards on shows including Golden Disc Awards and Gaon Chart Music Awards. Winner also found success in China, soon earning the Best New Force Group award at the QQ Music Awards alongside the Most Popular Korean Group award on the Youku Tudou Young Choice 2014.

On September 10, Winner released the Japanese version of their album, 2014 S/S: Japan Collection which peaked at No. 2 on the Oricon Weekly Album Chart, selling 35,079 copies in four days. They embarked on their first Japan tour the next day, later successfully concluding the tour in Tokyo on October 11, drawing 50,000 people in total. On December 9, Fuse announced their 13 Top Breakout Artists of 2014, with Winner at number 11, being the only South Korean artists on the list. Dazed Digital revealed their top 20 K-pop tracks of 2014 on December 17 with Winner's "Color Ring" placing tenth.

Despite the group's successful debut, in 2015, Winner was put on hiatus while members of the group pursued solo endeavors while simultaneously embarking on their second Japan tour beginning in September, and finishing in October with over 36,000 attendees. In December, they were revealed to be returning in 2016 with five 'project releases', where the first was a "warm-up" duet featuring Mino and Nam, titled "Pricked".

In the lead-up to the group's official comeback, a number of musical covers of their lead singles were released as promotional teasers, featured artists include Lee Hi,  Dean, AKMU, Zion.T, Epik High, Taeyang and G-Dragon. Winner returned with EP Exit : E on February 1, 18 months since 2014 S/S. 
Exit : E debuted at Number 2 on Billboards World Albums Chart and Number 1 on the Gaon Album chart. Lead singles "Baby Baby" and "Sentimental" topped all eight music streaming platforms in South Korea and achieved a real-time "all-kill", further proving their title as "digital monsters". Their lead single "Baby Baby" received profound attention in China, becoming the most streamed song within the first half of the year among Korean releases on QQ Music, the largest music platform in China. Winner held their first-ever concert tour nationwide starting on March 12 and 13 at Olympic Gymnasiums Arena in Seoul. The group also held additional stops in Gwangju, Daegu and Busan in April.

From April 23, Winner's variety show Half-Moon Friends aired on JTBC, which gained popularity both domestically and abroad, particularly garnering over 75 million views via Miaopai and surpassing 100 million views through other platforms in China. Their heightened success in China led them to winning the Overseas Popularity Award at the MTV Asia Music Gala. In June, the group brought their Exit Tour to Japan, drawing over 36,000 fans in Japan alone. On October 12, YGE announced Nam would be taking a break due to health problems, thus the rest of the Exit Movement series would be delayed indefinitely. On November 25, Nam's departure from the group was announced, soon deciding to continue as four.

2017–2019: Reformation, continued success and first world tour

After 14 months of hiatus, on April 4, 2017, Winner made their anticipated return as four with single album Fate Number For and lead singles "Really Really" and "Fool". Notably, the music video for "Really Really" was filmed by director Dave Meyers. Domestically, "Really Really" achieved placing number one on Gaon, while also debuting at No. 3 on Billboard World Digital Song Sales, marking the group's best position to date. "Really Really" was also chosen to be on the Apple Music's "Best of the Week" list. "Really Really" went on to creating the record of surpassing 100 million streams, making Winner the first ever male idol group in history to achieve this while keeping their "Chart-In" status. As part of their promotions, Winner held a three-day "concept showroom" showcase, from April 2 to 4, located at Club NB in Seoul. On May 31, they released their debut Japanese single, containing Japanese renditions of "Really Really" and "Fool". On August 4, Winner made a comeback with the single album Our Twenty For including lead singles, "Love Me Love Me" and "Island". "Love Me Love Me" was chosen by Dazed Digital as one of the 20 best K-Pop songs of 2017. Through tvN's New Journey to the West 4, Mino's wish to appear on Youth Over Flowers with his fellow Winner members was granted as a special supplementary show. Filming for Winner's Youth Over Flowers took place in West Australia while airing began on November 7. On November 30, Kang and Mino released the soundtrack, "The Door" for tvN's Prison Playbook, where Kang starred in.

On February 7, 2018, Winner released their first Japanese studio album, Our Twenty For, consisting new Japanese songs, "Raining" and "Have a Good Day". Soon after, the group embarked on their third Japan tour, "We'll Always Be Young". On April 4, Winner released their second studio album Everyday with lead single "Everyday" consisting of twelve songs including Korean versions of "Raining" and "Have a Good Day". The single became the group's first time experimenting with the genre, trap alongside reuniting with director Dave Meyers for the music video. On June 17, Winner successfully held their fan meeting, "WWIC 2018", 3 years since their last private stage in 2015. A total of 6,000 tickets were sold out. On July 4, Winner announced their first-ever world tour, Everywhere, starting in Seoul on August 19, followed seven stops throughout Asia. The tour resumed in January 2019 with an encore tour in Seoul. The same month, Winner branched their Everywhere tour to North America beginning with Seattle, followed six other cities including Los Angeles, Dallas, and Toronto. On November 26, Mino made his solo debut with studio album XX and lead single "Fiancé". The lead single topped Gaon's Digital and Streaming charts for the month of December. On December 19, Winner returned with single album Millions with lead single of the same name. Millions soon claimed the number two spot on Gaon, and received six music show wins.

On May 15, Winner released their second EP We, alongside lead single, "Ah Yeah". The single received positive reviews among the public for its cool lyrics that sublimates the realistic emotions of a cold-hearted breakup thus ultimately creating a cheerful breakup song. Through their comeback, the group entered the Gaon Chart with a triple crown, where "Ah Yeah" peaked at number one and two respectively on the Gaon Download and Digital Chart while EP We claimed number one on the Album Chart, selling over 129,000 physical copies. Winner performed their first broadcast stage for "Ah Yeah" on May 18 at MBC's Show! Music Core. On June 29, the group successfully held their private stage, WWIC 2019. The show was held twice within the same day at Jang Chung Gymnasium, Seoul. On July 3, Winner commenced on their 2019 concert tour in Japan starting with their concert at Nakano Sun Plaza in Tokyo while ending on September 16 at Marine Messe in Fukuoka. The tour garnered a total audience of 50,000 attendees in eight cities. On August 14, Kim Jin-woo became the third member of Winner to release solo material after Kang Seung-yoon and Mino. Kim made his solo debut with single album Jinu's Heyday and lead single "Call Anytime" (또또또) featuring bandmate Mino. The single album charted number two on Gaon Chart selling over 50,000 physical copies within the first week. Kim performed his first stage on August 17, also marking Winner's debut anniversary on MBC's Show! Music Core alongside bandmate Mino.

Winner released their third EP Cross with lead single "Soso" on October 23 ahead of Cross Tour. The music video for the lead single was well acclaimed and praised for its artistry and symbolism. Billboard stated: "The rawness of human emotion is relayed through intense scenes acted out by the group's members. Feelings of being stomped on and tied up by emotions and those around you are acted out, as is the idea of baring it all, a rarity in the K-pop world, while emotions such as lethargy, anger and melancholy are expressed through a variety of moments splintered across the screen". Through this comeback, Winner pushed out of the boundaries of "K-pop" and did what was considered an "anomaly" within the industry. With their Asian tour beginning in Seoul on October 26, the tour visited nine cities throughout Asia continuing onto February 2020. Later, it was revealed their stop in Singapore was cancelled due to the COVID-19 pandemic, soon also followed by the cancellation of their Seoul encore concert. The series of events led to the group holding a free online live concert entitled "Winner Cross Special Live" through Naver V Live on February 14, 2020, where they performed live singing and dancing for 2 hours, garnering almost 1 million attendees.

2020–present: Military enlistment and releases
On March 26, 2020, Winner's pre-release single titled "Hold" (뜸) charted number one on multiple South Korean music platforms including Naver, Bugs and Soribada. The music video gained various attention for its amusing and witty plot where label-mate Lee Su-hyun of AKMU played the group's little sister. Winner initiated a "Ddeum Challenge" on TikTok which garnered the attention of many while becoming a trending challenge within South Korea. Celebrities who partook included 2NE1's Sandara Park, model Hyoni Kang, CIX's Seunghun and Hyunsuk and many more.

Ahead of Winner's third studio album release on April 9, Kim Jin-woo became the first member to enlist and serve his mandatory military service on April 2, thus temporarily halting all full-group activities until all four members return after completing their mandatory enlistment. The studio album, entitled Remember, contains eight new songs, including its lead single of the same name and pre-release single, alongside four re-recorded songs from their debut album, 2014 S/S. Notably, the album recorded their highest first week sales since debut. Following Kim Jin-woo, Lee Seung-hoon became the second member to enlist on April 16.

The members of Winner renewed their contracts with YG Entertainment for five more years in August 2021.

Jin-woo was discharged on December 31, 2021, followed by Seung-hoon on January 15, 2022. On February 18, 2022, YG Entertainment announced Winner will hold their first full-group concert in two years on April 30 and May 1. While the April 30 event will only run in person at the Olympic Park Olympic Hall in Seoul, the concert on May 1 will also be available for online streaming. On June 20, 2022, YG Entertainment announced that Winner will make their comeback with their fourth EP Holiday and its lead single "I Love U" on July 5. On December 11, 2022, YG Entertainment It has been announced that Winner will hold an online concert "Winner Live Stage [White Holiday]" at 9:00 PM on December 29.

On March 2, 2023, YG Entertainment announced that Mino would serve as a social worker in the military, who is scheduled to enlist on March 24.

Artistry

Musicality and songwriting

Through multiple releases, Winner acquired the term 'Trust and Listen' among the general public of South Korea. The term originated as the public recognized the group's potential in creating quality music accordingly for the mass audience, and so just by the mention of the group's name, they will willingly listen without complaint. The term 'Kings of Summer' was also acquired through their positively received releases with upbeat tunes of various genres in correlation to the summer heat. Winner is also often known for their musical versatility. Ranging from ballad, blues, alternative rock, hip hop, disco and more, no restriction in genre is found. Apple Music cited them as "Versatile K-Pop chameleons" among the music scenes. Among releases, all members participate in production, composition and songwriting for all songs amidst album production from start to finish since debut. Overall, Kang Seung-yoon overlooks all production and is often cited as the main producer of the group. Their self-produced songs mainly encapsulate the themes of love, hope, consolation, and relatable everyday life stories.

Choreography
Winner has contributed to choreographing the majority of their songs, particularly member Lee Seung-hoon. For Winner, he has choreographed their debut lead singles "Empty" and "Color Ring" from 2014 S/S and "Fool" from Fate Number For, which he created and finalized within 5 hours. Winner went on to gain recognition for their lyrically displayed choreography to portray the messages of their songs. The group also broadened their scope by working with choreographers of different ethnic backgrounds, including African-American choreographer Oththan Burnside for the lead single "Really Really" from Fate Number For as well as the lead single "Everyday" alongside world renowned dance crew Kinjaz from the studio album of the same name.

Concept and stage
Since debut, Winner has heavily been invested towards creating concepts and providing ideas towards each and every upcoming release. Particularly through the quartet's Cross Tour (2019–2020), as a group they came up with the concept focusing on a 'spy agent' theme while also arranging two very different set lists, where the performances for both were held on different days throughout the tour. The set lists were differentiated through the symbols, x and +, where they also allude to the term "cross".

Impact and influence
Through interviews and social media platforms, members Tag and Hong Joo-chan of boy group Golden Child cited Winner as role models they look up to and is often influenced by them on multiple occasions throughout their career. Tag also once revealed he especially admired and respected Winner member Lee Seung-hoon since his K-pop Star days. A.C.E member Dong-hun stated Winner as an influence towards music, particularly the way Winner portrays their emotions and lyrics within a song, thus overall liking their style and wishes to express music in a similar manner. Former JBJ member Jin Longguo mentioned Winner as his role model while explaining within the music industry, some attract attention for their outer appearance in comparison to their musicality, further adding that Winner is a group that he believes has a good balance of both thus wishes to also follow these traits. In September 2019, newly debuted boy group Signal explicitly revealed through a press conference that Winner are their role models. They further elaborated that by listening to their music, they became heavily influenced by them. Yoo Yong-ha of WEi stated through GQ Korea that after falling for Winner, he wished to be "cool" like them and so despite having a shy personality trait, he took the courage to enroll into a vocal academy, and in result deciding to become an idol.

During festival season among universities in South Korea, Mersenne, a company that works on casting for these events revealed the most requested artists for the 2018 spring festival season. While labelmate PSY was placed at number one among all artists in South Korea, Winner was listed as the only male idol group beside labelmate iKon. In April 2019, five companies that worked on casting for these events, Mersenne, Innobay, 2M, Waikiki, and Top Plan, revealed the list of artists who were in high demand for the 2019 spring festival season. Regardless of age and gender, Winner was the only male idol group that year to be sought out by them.

Other ventures

Endorsements
Prior to debut, on January 17, 2014, Winner signed an exclusive endorsement contract with South Korean trendy casual clothing brand, NII, for the span of two years. The brand's insider revealed: "We selected Winner because Winner is a group who has big potential. We expect that they will create a new and fresh image for the NII brand". The same year Winner went on to becoming CF models for multiple brands, including Coca-Cola brand Fanta, Pizza Etang, Elite Uniform, and Adidas.

In August 2017, Winner became exclusive models for Italian sport brand Ellesse. With Winner as its endorser, 'Ellesse' sold 14 billion won in 2017 alongside the year end sales increasing by 160% in comparison to the previous years. An Ellesse representative also revealed through Winner as the face of the brand, a boost in customers from a younger generation significantly increased. In October 2017, Winner also joined clothing brand, '8Seconds' for their Good Luck Padding Campaign. Following Winner's first pictorial with the brand, their padded coats increased in sales by selling over 6,000 within two weeks. Due to popularity, the padded coats were often referred to as "Winner Padding".

On April 18, 2018, the Korean Culture and Information Service (KOCIS), part of the Ministry of Culture, Sports and Tourism announced Winner as its official campaign model for the global 'Talk Talk Korea 2018' contest. The contest gathered the most participants ever since its launch in 2014. On May 12, Winner joined Kiehl's on its third campaign held to protect nature inside cities with the #MyLittleGarden project. Winner sent out the message to recycle empty cosmetic bottles as flower pots to create their own garden and connect with nature in their daily lives. They also participated in label designing. On July 26, Café Droptop announced that Winner was the new face of the cafe franchise, revealing they believed the members suited well with the young image the brand desires. The franchise collaborated with Winner in creating numerous merchandises, which later instantly sold out. A Café Droptop official said: "Every time a product collaboration with Winner is released, it gains tremendous popularity where fans even wait in line at the stores." In October, Winner became the new endorsers of snack brand Oreo in Korea. Alongside filming a 30-second CF, Winner also recorded a Korean version of the CF's song. In February 2019, due to high popularity and demand, the advertisement with Winner aired in eight more countries, including Thailand, Singapore, Vietnam and Taiwan.

In June 2019, Winner became the official endorsement models for De Medicotem (DMT) Mask Packs. DMT further announced that with Winner, the brand will earnestly expand into the Asian market, including the existing Chinese market. DMT went on to find success as sales for the "Seven Hydro Zenith Mask" pack rose with Winner as the brand's image. Ahead of time, the brand held a collaboration with Winner during their private stage, WWIC 2019.

Philanthropy
On December 17, 2014, Winner took part in the Creating a Better World With Stars charity event, where they personally donated goods and attended a talk session. All the proceeds were donated to Good Neighbors, a humanitarian organization that helps single mothers and welfare of children.

On January 29, 2016, through the joint collaboration between clothing brand NII and photo studio "Thank You Studio", Winner participated in the animal campaign, Happiness by raising awareness through publications and photoshoots. Ultimately, all the proceeds from the campaign was donated to People for the Ethical Treatment of Animals (PETA). Winner further showed their love for animals by donating their merchandise and products to the SAC Pet Festival bazaar held on May 27, 2018, alongside fellow groups Got7, Red Velvet and more. The items were then auctioned and donated to charity.

A charity event organized by YG Entertainment and Muju YG Foundation in partnership with Unicef was held in Seoul on May 15, 2017, in commemoration of the company's 20th anniversary. The YG X Unicef Walking Festival reached its maximum capacity of 5,000 participants for the walk, where all profits were donated to the Korean Committee of Unicef for children suffering from malnutrition. Winner alongside many artists of YG Entertainment participated including actor Cha Seung-won, Sean of Jinusean and more.

Winner was reported to have donated 5.95 tonnes of rice and 100 kilograms of animal feed while together with the group's fan club, Inner Circles, donated 35.865 tonnes of rice, 2,840 packets of ramen, 48 cans of powdered milk, 1.604 tonnes of animal feed, 20 kilograms of cat food, 1,290 eggs and 180 briquettes on June 17, 2018, during their fan meeting, "WWIC 2018" private stage. In particular the rice was donated to single and unwed mothers alongside youth protection facilities.

On January 4, 2019, Winner announced all profit from their Millions postcard merchandise sales will be donated to KARA (Korea Animal Rights Advocates), a non profit organization that supports animal welfare in South Korea, with the intention to contribute towards protecting animals.

On January 18, 2020, through labelmate senior Big Bang Taeyang's charity flea market and auction, Flower Response (花答), Winner participated by contributing personal items with a combined total of over 700 items alongside Sandara Park, CL, AKMU, iKon and Ione, while Taeyang alone donated over 1,300 personal items. All proceeds were donated to Love Snail Charity, a social welfare organization dedicated to help provide cochlear implants and hearing aids to those in need.

Ambassadorship
 Korea Brand & Entertainment EXPO by KOTRA (2016 / 2019) 
  Korean Culture and Information Service (KOCIS) (2018)
 Paradise City Brand / PR Ambassador (2018)
 Crocs Brand Ambassador (2022) 
 Hanoi Ambassador Hallyu Expo (2022)

Discography

 2014 S/S (2014)
 Everyday (2018)
 Remember (2020)

Filmography

 WIN: Who Is Next 
 Winner TV 
 Half-Moon Friends 
 Youth Over Flowers 
 YG Future Strategy Office 
 Winner Vacation - Hoony Tour 
 W-Log 
 Bingo Trip 
 Winner Vacation - Bell Boys 
 Real Now-Winner Edition 
 Artist Way

Concerts and tours

Headlining tours
 Zepp Tour in Japan 
 Japan Tour 
 Exit Tour 
 Japan Tour 2018 ~We'll always be young~ 
 Everywhere World Tour 
 Winner Japan Tour 
 Cross Tour 

Concerts
 Winner 2022 Concert 

Joint tours
 YG Family – Power World Tour 

Opening act/guest performer
 Big Bang – Japan Dome Tour 
2NE1 – All Or Nothing World Tour

Awards and nominations

Notes

References

External links

 

 
K-pop music groups
Musical groups established in 2013
South Korean boy bands
South Korean dance music groups
South Korean pop music groups
YG Entertainment artists
Musical groups from Seoul
2013 establishments in South Korea
MAMA Award winners
Melon Music Award winners